Ahmed Wagih El-Kashef (5 February 1909 – 1973) was an Egyptian football forward who played for Egypt in the 1934 FIFA World Cup. He also played for Al Ahly SC and Zamalek SC, and represented Egypt at the 1936 Summer Olympics.

References

1909 births
1973 deaths
Egyptian footballers
Egypt international footballers
Olympic footballers of Egypt
Footballers at the 1936 Summer Olympics
Association football forwards
Al Ahly SC players
1934 FIFA World Cup players